Saad Sattam Saud Al Shammari (born 6 August 1980, in Rafha) is a Saudi Arabian-born Qatari footballer who plays as a central defender for El Jaish in the Qatar Stars League, He also plays for the Qatari national team.

Saad's brother, Fahad Al Shammari plays for Al Gharafa.

Club career
He is currently playing in newly promoted team Al Jaish after joining them from Al Gharafa in 2011. He previously played for Danish side Esbjerg fB in 2004. He has won the Qatari league three times and several domestic cup titles.

International career
He was a part of the squad that won the Gulf Cup in 2004 over Oman on penalties. He scored one goal in the group stage.

Honours
Al Gharafa
Qatari League: 2004-05, 2007–08, 2008-09
Emir of Qatar Cup: 2009
Qatar Crown Prince Cup: 2000
Sheikh Jassem Cup: 2005, 2007

Qatar
Gulf Cup: 2004

Personal life
He married in 2009 in his hometown of Rafha, Kingdom of Saudi Arabia.

External links
FIFA.com profile

QSL.com.qa profile

References

1980 births
Living people
Qatari footballers
Qatari expatriate footballers
Qatar international footballers
2000 AFC Asian Cup players
2004 AFC Asian Cup players
2007 AFC Asian Cup players
Al-Gharafa SC players
Esbjerg fB players
El Jaish SC players
Umm Salal SC players
Al-Wakrah SC players
Qatar Stars League players
Danish Superliga players
Naturalised citizens of Qatar
Qatari people of Saudi Arabian descent
Saudi Arabian emigrants to Qatar
Footballers at the 2002 Asian Games
Association football fullbacks
Asian Games competitors for Qatar
Expatriate men's footballers in Denmark
Qatari expatriate sportspeople in Denmark